Parchur or Parchuru is a town and an Assembly constituency in Bapatla district of Andhra Pradesh, India. It is also the mandal headquarters of Parchur mandal in  chirala revenue division.

Geography 

According to the 2011 Census of India, the total population of Parchur was then 13,379, of which 6,628 were male and 6,751 were female.

Transport 
Guntur-Parchur Road connects the village with Guntur and Ongole.

See also 
Vupputur

References 

Villages in Prakasam district
Mandal headquarters in Prakasam district